The Lotte World II Hotel was a proposed supertall skyscraper to be constructed next to the Lotte World amusement park, shopping and hotel complex in Seoul, South Korea that would have risen to  with 123 floors if completed.

References

Unbuilt buildings and structures in South Korea
Unbuilt skyscrapers